Ursi is both a surname and a given name. Notable people with the name include:

 Corrado Ursi (1908–2003), Italian Roman Catholic archbishop and cardinal
 Giorgio Ursi (1942–1982), Italian cyclist
 Ursi Walliser (born 1975), Swiss skeleton racer

See also
 Eugenio D'Ursi (born 1995), Italian footballer
 International Union of Radio Science (URSI), international organization
 Sabatino de Ursis (1575–1620), Italian Jesuit missionary
 Ursa (disambiguation)
 Urşi (disambiguation)
 Ursu, surname

Italian-language surnames